Platanus  is a genus consisting of a small number of tree species native to the Northern Hemisphere. They are the sole living members of the family Platanaceae.

All mature members of Platanus are tall, reaching  in height. All except for P. kerrii are deciduous, and most are found in riparian or other wetland habitats in the wild, though proving drought-tolerant in cultivation. The hybrid London plane (Platanus × acerifolia) has proved particularly tolerant of urban conditions, and has been widely planted in London and elsewhere in the United Kingdom.

They are often known in English as planes  or plane trees. A formerly used name that is now rare is plantain tree (not to be confused with other, unrelated, species with the name). Some North American species are called sycamores (especially Platanus occidentalis), although the term is also used for several unrelated species of trees. The genus name Platanus comes from Ancient Greek , which referred to Platanus orientalis.

Botany

The flowers are reduced and are borne in balls (globose heads); 3–7 hairy sepals may be fused at the base, and the petals are 3–7 and are spatulate. Male and female flowers are separate, but borne on the same plant (monoecious). The number of heads in one cluster (inflorescence) is indicative of the species (see table below). The male flower has 3–8 stamens; the female has a superior ovary with 3–7 carpels. Plane trees are wind-pollinated. Male flower-heads fall off after shedding their pollen.

After being pollinated, the female flowers become achenes that form an aggregate ball. The fruit is a multiple of achenes  (plant systematics, Simpson M. G., 2006).  Typically, the core of the ball is 1 cm in diameter and is covered with a net of mesh 1 mm, which can be peeled off. The ball is 2.5–4 cm in diameter and contains several hundred achenes, each of which has a single seed and is conical, with the point attached downward to the net at the surface of the ball. There is also a tuft of many thin stiff yellow-green bristle fibers attached to the base of each achene. These bristles help in wind dispersion of the fruits as in the dandelion.

The leaves are simple and alternate. In the subgenus Platanus  they have a palmate outline. The base of the leaf stalk (petiole) is enlarged and completely wraps around the young stem bud in its axil. The axillary bud is exposed only after the leaf falls off.

The mature bark peels off or exfoliates easily in irregularly shaped patches, producing a mottled, scaly appearance. On old trunks, bark may not flake off, but thickens and cracks instead.

Phylogeny
There are two subgenera, subgenus Castaneophyllum containing the anomalous P. kerrii, and subgenus Platanus, with all the others; recent studies in Mexico have increased the number of accepted species in this subgenus. Within subgenus Platanus, evidence from both chloroplast and nuclear gene sequences suggests that the P. racemosa species complex in Western North America (including P. racemosa, P. gentryi , P. wrigthii) is more closely related to the Western Eurasian P. orientalis than it is to the other North American species (P. mexicana sensu lato, including up to four species: P. chiapaensis, P. lindeniana, P. [×] mexicana sensu stricto, P. oaxacana; P. occidentalis s.l. with two [sub]species: P. occidentalis, P. palmeri; P. rzedowskii). The two groups form genetically and morphologically distinct evolutionary lineages (sister clades), informally called the “ANA clade” (Atlantic North American lineage) and “PNA-E clade” (Pacific North American-European lineage). Both lineages have been affected by reticulate evolutionary processes in the past (ancient or recent hybridization and introgression):

 Platanus palmeri (= P. occidentalis var. palmeri) – forming the southwesternmost populations of P. occidentalis s.l. – carries nuclear intron sequences (second intron of the Leafy gene) of PNA-E origin. It lacks the plastid haplotype specific for the northeastern populations (P. occidentalis s.str.)
 The internal transcribed spacers of the nuclear-encoded rRNA genes of P. occidentalis s.l. and P. rzedowskii include ANA-specific variants with functional 5.8S rDNA as well as PNA-E-specific variants showing signs of pseudogeny. The latter are shared with P. gentryi, the PNA-E species closest to the ANA clade area and the northern/ interior populations of P. mexicana s.l. This indicates that already the common ancestor of P. rzedowskii and P. occidentalis s.l. had been in contact with a member of the PNA-E clade. 
 Likewise, P. rzedowskii from Nueva León is a genetic mosaic, and may have originated from earlier hybridization within the ANA clade, between southernmost P. occidentalis s.l. (P. palmeri) and P. mexicana s.l., or their ancestors. Today the ranges of P. occidentalis s.l. and P. mexicana s.l. are mutually exclusive. Platanus rzedowskii is geographically and morphologically intermediate between P. occidentalis s.l. and P. mexicana s.l. 
 Morphological reinvestigation including the originally collected material revealed that the interior populations of P. mexicana (northern Querétaro and northern Hidalgo; P. mexicana var. interior according Nixon & Poole) mark the hybrid zone between P. rzedowskii and P. mexicana s.l. and the (former) contact zone to the species of the PNA-E clade (P. gentryi, P. wrightii). Since the holotype of P. mexicana is from this zone and shows the characteristical intermediate morphology, P. mexicana s.str. would represent a nothospecies: P. × mexicana. The remaining populations of P. mexicana s.l., P. lindeniana, show no sign of introgression from either P. rzedowskii, P. occidentalis-palmeri or the Western North American species (P. racemosa species aggregate), with the exception of one heterozygotic P. oaxacana population from northcentral Oaxaca. 

The genus Platanus exemplarily illustrates the concept of a Coral of Life, a species network. Its modern-day species are not only the product of evolutionary dichotomies (cladogenesis), the splitting of an ancestral lineage into two (Tree of Life metaphor) but also evolutionary anastomoses: hybridization and introgression.

The fossil record of leaves and fruit identifiable to Platanus begins in the Paleocene. Despite the geographic separation between North America and Old World, species from these continents will cross readily resulting in fertile hybrids such as the London plane, which is an anthropogenic hybrid (cultivar) between the North American P. occidentalis sensu stricto (ANA clade) and the Mediterranean P. orientalis (PNA-E clade). Widely used as a park tree across Europe, it frequently backcrosses with its native parent.

Species
The following are recognized species of plane trees:

Diseases

Planes are susceptible to plane anthracnose (Apiognomonia veneta), a fungal disease that can defoliate the trees in some years. The most severe infections are associated with cold, wet spring weather. P. occidentalis and the other American species are the most susceptible, with P. orientalis the most resistant. The hybrid London plane is intermediate in resistance.

Ceratocystis platani, a wilt disease, has become a significant problem in recent years in much of Europe. The North American species are mostly resistant to the disease, with which they probably coevolved, while the old world species are highly sensitive.

Other diseases such as powdery mildew occur frequently, but are of lesser importance.

Platanus species are used as food plants by the larvae of some Lepidoptera species including Phyllonorycter platani and Setaceous Hebrew Character.

In the 21st century a disease, commonly known as Massaria disease, has attacked plane trees across Europe. It is caused by the fungus Splanchnonema platani, and causes large lesions on the upper sides of branches.

Uses
The principal use of these trees is as ornamental trees, especially in urban areas and by roadsides. The London plane is particularly popular for this purpose. The American plane is cultivated sometimes for timber and investigations have been made into its use as a biomass crop. The oriental plane is widely used as an ornamental and also has a number of minor medicinal uses.

Cultural history

Most significant aspects of cultural history apply to Platanus orientalis in the Old World. The tree is an important part of the literary scenery of Plato's dialogue Phaedrus. Because of Plato, the tree also played an important role in the scenery of Cicero's De Oratore. The trees also provided the shade under which Aristotle and Plato’s famed philosophical schools were held.  Handel's opera Serse features a famous aria, "Ombra mai fu," which the title character sings in praise of his favorite plane tree.

The plane tree has been a frequent motif featured in Classical Chinese poetry as an embodiment of sorrowful sentiments due to its autumnal shedding of leaves.

The legendary Dry tree first recorded by Marco Polo was possibly a platanus. According to the legend, it marked the site of the battle between Alexander the Great and Darius III.

The German camouflage pattern Platanenmuster ("plane tree pattern"), designed in 1937–1942 by Johann Georg Otto Schick, was the first dotted camouflage pattern.

Footnotes

References
Books
 

Journals
 
 

Web

External links

 Botany of plane trees
 A short informal account  concentrating on the North American species
 A developmental and evolutionary analysis of embryology in Platanus (Platanaceae), a basal eudicot, abstract of article by Sandra K. Floyd et al. in American Journal of Botany, 1999;86:1523–1537.
 Photos, measurements, and location details of large plane trees worldwide

 
Platanaceae
Eudicot genera